Rufat Balakishiyev (born 28 December 1983), is an Azerbaijani futsal player who plays for Neftchi Baku and the Azerbaijan national futsal team.

References

External links 
 UEFA profile

1983 births
Living people
Azerbaijani men's futsal players